Rex Black (born July 16, 1964) is a software engineer, entrepreneur and an author in the field of software testing. Black graduated from the University of California at Los Angeles (UCLA) in 1990 with a bachelors of science in computer science and engineering. In 1983, Black started work in the software engineering field and has spent more than 20 years in software testing.

Black is chief executive officer and founder of RBCS, Inc. Black has also taught courses in managing the testing process at the University of Texas at Austin Center for Lifelong Engineering Education and is an adjunct faculty member and course developer of business analysis and software testing curricula for Villanova University. He serves on editorial board of Software Test & Performance Magazine.

Software quality advocacy
From April 2005 to April 2009, Black served as president of the International Software Testing Qualifications Board (ISTQB), an international group of 40 international boards responsible for the international qualification scheme called "ISTQB Certified Tester." Black also co-authored the ISTQB Advanced Syllabus (released in July 2007), and is vice chair of the Working Party Foundation Level ISTQB Syllabus.

From January 2005 to January 2008, Black was president of the American Software Testing Qualifications Board (ASTQB), a branch of the International Software Testing Qualification Board. He currently sits on the ASTQB Board of Directors.

Black served on the Program Committee and as a Session Chair for the Third World Congress on Software Quality in Munich in September 2005. He’s also presented at the 2008 World Congress on Software Quality in Maryland and the 2009-2013, Software Testing Conference (Softec09 and SoftecAsia13) in Kuala Lumpur.

Selected bibliography

Books
 
 
 
 
 
 
  (Includes Indian, Chinese, Russian, and Japanese editions.)

Articles

References

External links
 Official RBCS, Inc. homepage
 O’Reilly Media author biography
 Villanova Faculty Profile

Living people
Software testing people
1964 births